Russia's Elena Dementieva defeated compatriot Dinara Safina in the final, 3–6, 7–5, 6–3 to win the gold medal in Women's Singles tennis at the 2008 Summer Olympics. In the bronze medal match, Russia's Vera Zvonareva defeated China's Li Na 6–0, 7–5. This was the first Olympic medal sweep in tennis since 1908, when three British women won medals in the outdoor women's singles tournament. It was the fifth podium sweep in tennis in Olympic history, all previous sweeps were by British athletes. It was Russia's first victory in the women's singles. Dementieva became the third woman to win multiple Olympic singles medals, following Steffi Graf (1988 and 1992) and Arantxa Sánchez Vicario (1992 and 1996), and the first to do so in non-consecutive Games.

The tournament was held from August 10 to August 17 at the National Tennis Center in Beijing, China. The DecoTurf surface made the event a hardcourt tournament. There were 64 competitors from 33 nations.

Justine Henin was the reigning gold medalist from 2004, but she retired from the sport earlier that year.

Background

This was the 11th appearance of the women's singles tennis. A women's event was held only once during the first three Games (only men's tennis was played in 1896 and 1904), but has been held at every Olympics for which there was a tennis tournament since 1908. Tennis was not a medal sport from 1928 to 1984, though there were demonstration events in 1968 and 1984.

Returning from the 2004 Games were bronze medalist Alicia Molik of Australia and quarterfinalists Francesca Schiavone of Italy, Ai Sugiyama of Japan, and Svetlana Kuznetsova of Russia. 2000 gold medalist Venus Williams (who had lost in the third round in 2004) and silver medalist Elena Dementieva (a shocking first-round loss to Molik in 2004) also returned. Venus's sister, Serena Williams, made her Olympic singles debut after withdrawing in 2004 due to injury. Reigning Olympic champion Justine Henin of Belgium had retired earlier in 2008. The #1 seed, Ana Ivanovic of Serbia, withdrew due to an injury. This left a relatively open field, with Ivanovic's countrywoman Jelena Janković, the Williams sisters, and the four Russian players (Kuznetsova, Dementieva, Dinara Safina, and Vera Zvonareva) among the top contenders.

Serbia made its (post-separation from Montenegro) debut in the event. France made its 10th appearance, most among nations to that point, having missed only the 1908 Games in London (when only British players competed).

Qualification

Qualification for the women's singles was primarily through the WTA ranking list of 9 June 2008. Nations had been limited to four players in the event since the 2000 Games. There were 64 quota places available for women's singles. The first 56 were assigned through the world ranking. There were two Tripartite Commission invitation places and 6 final qualification places allocated by the ITF based on continental and national representation along with world rankings.

Competition format

The competition was a single-elimination tournament with a bronze medal match. Matches were in best-of-3 sets. No tiebreak was played in the final set.

Schedule

Seeds

Draw

 INV = Tripartite Invitation
 IP = ITF place

Finals

Top half

Section 1

Section 2

Bottom half

Section 3

Section 4

References

External links
Draw

Women's Singles
2008 in women's tennis
Women's events at the 2008 Summer Olympics